West Asian Championship (Men) 2007 (Iran)

Final table 

All matches  in Amol.

Matches and results

Winner

References 

2007
2007
WAFF
2007–08 in Iranian futsal
2007–08 in Lebanese football
2007–08 in Iraqi football
2007–08 in Jordanian football